The South African Railways Class 14B 4-8-2 of 1915 was a steam locomotive.

In 1915, the South African Railways placed fifteen Class 14B saturated steam locomotives with a 4-8-2 Mountain type wheel arrangement in service. When they were subsequently converted to superheating, they were reclassified to Class 14. In the 1930s all but one were reboilered with Watson Standard no. 2 boilers and reclassified to Class 14R.

Manufacturer
The third version of the Class 14 locomotive was ordered from Beyer, Peacock and Company in 1914. Fifteen locomotives were delivered in 1915, numbered in the range from 1746 to 1760. These saturated steam versions of the Class 14 were designated Class 14B.

Characteristics

Like the Class 14, the Class 14B had Walschaerts valve gear and a Belpaire firebox. Because it was intended for use on the lower section of the Natal mainline, D.A. Hendrie, Chief Mechanical Engineer (CME) of the South African Railways (SAR), concluded that no high degree of superheat would be attainable and the locomotives were therefore ordered without superheaters. They were intended for use on the Town Hill section near Pietermaritzburg, where the old line was on a 1 in 30 (3⅓%) gradient and where speeds were low with frequent stops which, it was reasoned, would not justify the use of superheating.

Modification and reclassification
Once in service, the omission of superheating soon became a bone of contention. About six years after the Class 14B was commissioned, an officer of the Mechanical Department submitted a report which claimed that the loss of haulage power and increased water and coal consumption which were brought about by the absence of superheating on these engines, represented a loss to the SAR of approximately £100,000 when compared with the superheated . Given that eight years later, in 1929, the purchase price of a new Class 19A locomotive would be £6,387 (£5,323 for the engine and £1,064 for the tender), this was a staggering amount.

This report caused a flutter in the Railways Administration. The officer who made it, left the service to do very well elsewhere. Conversion of the Class 14B to superheating began soon afterwards. Between 1922 and 1925, all fifteen Class 14B locomotives were converted.

Of all the locomotives introduced during Hendrie's term as CME, the Class 14B was the only one to fall short of expectations. In fairness to Hendrie and his decision to omit superheating, it should be borne in mind that, at the time, automatic dampers were still in use, which cut out the superheater while the regulator was closed. This reduced much of the superheater's effectiveness on undulating track and where frequent stops are required. A report had been submitted in Natal earlier to the effect that superheating was of little or no advantage on that System, where the many short and steep gradients prevented a high degree of superheat from being attained with the automatic dampers in use at the time. In view of the added cost and weight of the superheating equipment, the arguments against it in Natal were therefore considered reasonable at the time.

Watson Standard boilers
During the 1930s, many serving locomotives were reboilered with a standard boiler type designed by then CME A.G. Watson as part of his standardisation policy. Such Watson Standard reboilered locomotives were reclassified by adding an "R" suffix to their classification.

From 1935, all the ex Class 14B locomotives except no. 1750 were reboilered with Watson Standard no. 2 boilers and reclassified to Class 14R. Only slight modifications were found necessary to take the new boilers. In the process, the engines were also equipped with Watson cabs with their distinctive slanted fronts, compared to the conventional vertical fronts of the original cabs. The flangeless leading coupled wheels were flanged and Type MR tenders were attached to the reboilered engines. No. 1750 was sold to ISCOR without being reboilered.

Their original Belpaire boilers were fitted with Ramsbottom safety valves, while the Watson Standard boiler was fitted with Pop safety valves. An obvious difference between an original and a Watson Standard reboilered locomotive is usually a rectangular regulator cover, just to the rear of the chimney on the reboilered locomotive. In the case of the ex Class 14B locomotives, two even more obvious differences are the Watson cab and the absence of the Belpaire firebox hump between the cab and boiler on the reboilered locomotives.

Service

South African Railways
The locomotives were initially in service on the lower sections of the Natal mainline, particularly the Town Hill section near Pietermaritzburg. After their reboilering and the electification of the Natal mainline, most were then allocated to Empangeni in the north and Port Shepstone in the south. In 1976, many were transferred to the Witwatersrand for shunting service. They were all withdrawn from service by 1983.

Industrial
Five of these engines were eventually sold into industrial service:
 No. 1750 became ISCOR no. 15 and later Enyati Colliery no. 3.
 No. 1754 and no. 1759 went to Rustenburg Platinum Mines, retaining their SAR numbers.
 No. 1755 became St Helena Gold Mines no. 7.
 No. 1757 was sold to Grootvlei Proprietary Mines Limited.

Preservation
No. 1459 is the sole survivor of the Class 14B and 14R and is in storage at Bloemfontein Loco Depot.

References

1760
1760
1760
4-8-2 locomotives
2D1 locomotives
Beyer, Peacock locomotives
Cape gauge railway locomotives
Railway locomotives introduced in 1915
1915 in South Africa
Scrapped locomotives